The Brno death march began late on the night of 30 May 1945 when the ethnic German minority in Brno was expelled to nearby Austria following the capture of the city by the Allies during World War II. Only about half of expellees actually crossed the border. Thousands of people were held in the provisional camps in the border area. While some Germans were later allowed to return to Brno, hundreds of others fell victim to diseases, rape, torture and malnutrition in the following weeks. The number of fatalities caused by the march and imprisonment is disputed as it became part of propaganda: the estimates range between 500 and 8,000.

Background

Liberation of Brno
After six years of German occupation the city of Brno, capital of the Czechoslovak province Moravia, was liberated on 26 April 1945 by the Soviet and Romanian armies of 2nd Ukrainian Front, in the context of the Bratislava–Brno Offensive. The next day, the Nazi German administration of the city was abolished and replaced by newly created and Czech-led Národní výbor města Brna ("People's Committee of the City of Brno"). While at the beginning of 1945 there were about 58,000 Germans registered in the city, most them were evacuated before the fighting reached the city or fled on their own in fear of the Red Army. After the liberation the Národní výbor registered about 26,000 people considered as Germans. Shortly after, the Germans were marked with white armbands and became subject to similar restrictions previously directed against the Jews by the Nazis.

Prelude to expulsion
Shortly after the war had ended, the Czechoslovak government incited the expulsion of its large ethnic German minority from the country. Over half a million people were forced to march to the German and Austrian borders and thousands were killed.
During May 1945 the Národní výbor several times discussed the need to punish Nazi war criminals, their Czech collaborators and the general situation of Germans in the city. About 1,500 people were arrested, most of them Germans. On 23 May the Národní výbor of Brno urged the Czechoslovak government to immediately establish courts for such criminals, because the people in Brno were rioting in front of the prison in an attempt to lynch the prisoners. Moreover, there was severe housing shortage in Brno as a consequence of the combat and previous bombings. In particular, factory workers demanded confiscation of the apartments of the Germans, as the Germans had done with the apartments of the Jews.

On 30 May 1945 the Zemský národní výbor ("Provincial National Committee"), which resided in Brno, issued its order No. 78/1945, which ordered the immediate expulsion of the non-working German population from Brno. All women, boys under the age of 14 and men over the age of 60 should leave the city immediately, and the working men after they had been replaced in their work. On the morning of 30 May the representatives of the large firearm factory in Brno urged the police director to fulfill this order immediately. They also offered armed men from the factory to assist. In order to select the particular Germans to be expelled, police used a rationing system which was originally introduced by Germans at the Invasion of Poland and which also allocated food to the recipients by race and ethnicity.

The march 
According to police reports, 18,072 Germans were expelled.

While the Sudeten German propaganda later claimed thousands of people were killed on the march or in Rajhrad and "the road was paved with corpses", there are only 3 confirmed deaths (2 of them violent). As of 2015, none of the alleged mass graves has been found along the road. The next morning the group reached the small town of Pohořelice,  further south. Next to the town was an abandoned concentration camp in which the Germans of Brno were interned.

The next day, 1 June, many people were too exhausted, so the guards selected approximately 10,000 people still able to walk and escorted them to the Austrian border near Mikulov. At the time, the representatives of Austria in Brno as well as Soviet occupation authorities in Austria had already protested against this unarranged transfer of large numbers of people, and persuaded the Czechoslovak government to stop the expulsion. About half of the expellees thus remained in the camp of Pohořelice.

Pohořelice camp

History of the camp in Pohořelice 
The town of Pohořelice had a large German minority and after the Munich agreement it became part of the Third Reich. After the outbreak of the war a small camp for prisoners of war was established near the town. In 1944 it became a concentration camp for Hungarian Jews who were used for the hardest work. The Jews were liberated by the Red Army in the middle of April 1945 and the then empty camp was used to accommodate the Germans of Brno, whose number by far exceeded the camp's capacity.

Living conditions 
Since the Austrian authorities refused to accept any people before their Austrian origin was proven and since the Czech authorities in Brno considered the return of Germans to Brno as politically unacceptable, the Czechoslovak Ministry of Interior decided that the group of approximately 10,000 Germans had to stay in Pohořelice and surrounding villages, where significant German minorities were already accommodated. As the Pohořelice camp was abandoned more than a month before, there was no opportunity to provide proper housing, food and health care for thousands of people. Not until 5 June was proper camp administration established and regular food supply provided. At this time, an epidemic of dysentery (shigellosis) broke out. According to official records, 455 dead were buried near the town of Pohořelice, mostly victims of diseases. Sudeten German sources, however, estimated that between 1,300–8,000 people either died of disease or were murdered.

Later in June, the camp inmates were better identified and approximately 2,000-2,500 were selected and allowed to return to Brno, most of whom had Czech origin or Czech relatives in Brno. Once the news about their return spread into the city, police reported a new wave of anti-German protests. About 1,000 expellees were accommodated by families of surrounding villages, and 1,807 mostly elderly people were relocated to the former Institute for Juvenile in Mušlov next to Mikulov. Hundreds of individuals with German or Austrian citizenship were allowed to go to Austria. Others were sent to other camps in Brno and Svatobořice.

The camp in Pohořelice was officially dissolved on 7 July 1945. At this time, there were still about 80 Germans from Brno in Pohořelice, about 60 of them were sick people in provisory hospital.

Casualties 
Because of the quick improvised course of events, the exact number of casualties is very difficult to state. The estimates vary widely and have become a source of political disputes and propaganda.

Austrian researchers found 1,950 victims of the march itself, 2,000 victims in the Pohořelice camp and 190 victims in surrounding villages. In total 4,140 German victims from Brno plus 1,062 who died in Austria.

German sources regard the later communist police officer Bedřich Pokorný as responsible of organizing the Ústí massacre of hundreds of ethnic Germans on 31 July 1945. There have been attempts to confirm statements that Pokorný had thousands of people executed. Emilia Hrabovec was unable to substantiate these charges but instead, according to her research, old people and tired young children had been sent away on trucks under supervision of Czechoslovak guards.

According to official death records from 1945, 455 people from Brno died and were buried in Pohořelice (near the town), 129 in Mušlov, 65 in villages surrounding the town of Pohořelice. In total 649 victims originally expulsed from Brno died on Czech territory.

Remembrance
In 1995 Czech writer Ludvík Vaculík filed criminal charge for the crime of genocide related to the event of expulsion of Germans from Brno. Czech police however did not find evidence for such crime as there were only 3 confirmed violent deaths (two on the march and one later in Mušlov).

In 2000 a group of young Czech students called for an adequate way to remember the events in Brno. In 2015 the council of Brno officially regretted the harm on the victims of the death march and organized a "Pilgrimage of Reconciliation" along the route.

In 2002, a joint commission of German and Czech historians collected evidence and published the results in a book titled Rozumět dějinám ("Understanding History").

In 2007 a group of young people organized a night Memorial March from Brno to Pohořelice to commemorate the event. At the first time, only three people participated in the march and in the following years about 20-30 people attended. On the 70th anniversary of the event in 2015 the march was supported by the city of Brno and the number of participants was about 300, including some representatives of Sudeten German organisations. Until 2013 some eyewitnesses also participated in the memorial march.

There is a memorial stone in St Thomas's Abbey garden to bear the tragic events in remembrance.

See also
 Ústí massacre
 Lidice massacre

References

External links
The Deathmarch of Bruenn – events described from the BRUNA's (organisation of expelled Brno Germans) point of view
Der Brünner Todesmarsch – das Ende einer Ära (Brno Death March – the End of One Epoch)  – larger, more detailed version of the previous article
Das Deutsche Brünn und sein Ende (German Brno and its End)  – another BRUNNA's publication
„Brněnský pochod smrti“: mýty a skutečnost ("Brno Death March": Myths and Reality)  – a lecture from international scientific colloquium “Sixty Years since the End of World War II: The End of the Czech-German Coexistence in Czechoslovakia” held in Brno in April 2005

Conflicts in 1945
Czechoslovakia in World War II
Ethnic cleansing of Germans
Post–World War II forced migrations
Forced marches
German diaspora in Europe
History of Brno
May 1945 events